Collagen IV (ColIV or Col4) is a type of collagen found primarily in the basal lamina.  The collagen IV C4 domain at the C-terminus is not removed in post-translational processing, and the fibers link head-to-head, rather than in parallel.  Also, collagen IV lacks the regular glycine in every third residue necessary for the tight, collagen helix.  This makes the overall arrangement more sloppy with kinks.  These two features cause the collagen to form in a sheet, the form of the basal lamina. Collagen IV is the more common usage, as opposed to the older terminology of "type-IV collagen". Collagen IV exists in all metazoan phyla, to whom they served as an evolutionary stepping stone to multicellularity. 

There are six human genes associated with it:
 COL4A1, COL4A2, COL4A3, COL4A4, COL4A5, COL4A6

Clinical significance
The alpha-3 subunit (COL4A3) of collagen IV is thought to be the antigen implicated in Goodpasture syndrome, wherein the immune system attacks the basement membranes of the glomeruli and the alveoli upon the antigenic site on the alpha-3 subunit becomes unsequestered due to environmental exposures.

Goodpasture syndrome presents with nephritic syndrome and hemoptysis. Microscopic evaluation of biopsied renal tissue will reveal linear deposits of Immunoglobulin G by immunofluorescence. This is classically in young adult males.

Mutations to the genes[COL4A5] coding for collagen IV lead to Alport syndrome.  This will cause thinning and splitting of the glomerular basement membrane.  It will present as isolated hematuria, sensorineural hearing loss, and ocular disturbances and is passed on genetically, usually in an X-linked manner, although there are rarer autosomal forms.

Liver fibrosis and cirrhosis are associated with the deposition of collagen IV in the liver. Serum Collagen IV concentrations correlate with hepatic tissue levels of collagen IV in subjects with alcoholic liver disease and hepatitis C and fall following successful therapy.

Mutations in COL4A1 exons 24 and 25 are associated with HANAC (autosomal dominant hereditary angiopathy with nephropathy, aneurysms, and muscle cramps). It has also been confirmed that mutations in the COL4A1 gene occur in some patients with porencephaly and schizencephaly.

In humans, a novel mutation of the COL4A1 gene coding for collagen type IV was found to be associated with autosomal dominant congenital cataract in a Chinese family. This mutation was not found in unaffected family members or in 200 unrelated controls. In this study, sequence analysis confirmed that the Gly782 amino acid residue was highly conserved. This report of a new mutation in the COL4A1 gene is the first report of a non-syndromic autosomal dominant congenital cataract that highlights an important role for collagen type IV in the physiological and optical properties of the lens.

Additionally, in the cardiovascular field, the COL4A1 and COL4A2 regions on chromosome 13q34 are a highly replicated locus for coronary artery disease. In a normal wall of arteries, collagen type IV acts to inhibit smooth muscle cell proliferation. Accordingly, it was demonstrated that protein expression of collagen type IV in human vascular smooth muscle cells is regulated by both SMAD3 protein and TGFβ mediated stimulation of mRNA. Altogether, it was concluded that the pathogenesis of coronary artery disease may be regulated by COL4A1 and COL4A2 genes.

An autosomal recessive encephalopathy associated with mutations in this gene has also been reported.

Increased glomerular and mesangial deposition of collagen IV occurs in diabetic nephropathy and increased urinary levels are associated with the extent of renal injury.

See also
Spongin, a variant of this collagen type found in some animals

References

External links
 

Collagens